The National emblem of Mongolia (Mongol Ulsīn törín süld) is used by the government of Mongolia as its symbol of state. It is officially used for example on documents such as Mongolian passports, and government and embassy placards.

Description 
The state emblem was adopted on February 12, 1992, when the new constitution came into force. The details of it are laid out in Chapter 1, Article 12(3) of the Constitution of Mongolia. 

The outer rim features a tumen nasan, symbolizing eternity, surrounding a circular blue field, symbolizing the sky. On the centre of the field is a combination of the Soyombo symbol and the wind horse (treasured steed), symbolizing Mongolia's independence, sovereignty, and spirit. Sun, moon and fire symbols derived from the Xiongnu. Above the field is a Cintamani (Чандмань), representing the Buddhist Three Jewels, which in Mongolian folklore grants wishes. Below the central emblem is a green mountain range, with the Wheel of Dharma (Хүрд) at the center. On the bottom of the mountain range and wheel is a khadag (Хадаг), a ceremonial scarf.

History 

From 1960 to 1991, the Mongolian People's Republic used an emblem with a very similar shape, but with several differing elements. Instead of the Wind Horse, a horseman on a normal horse is shown. In the background, the sun rises above mountains. The Buddhist symbols are replaced by symbols of Socialism. A gearwheel stands for industrialization, sheaves around the perimeter stand for the farming class, and the top featured a red star with the socialist version of the Soyombo.

Before 1961, the emblem did not bear most of the socialist symbols. The horseman carried a long lasso pole and the heads of four types of herd animals were shown on the sides. A red ribbon at the bottom bore the name of the country in the traditional Mongolian alphabet between 1940 and 1949 with the Cyrillic abbreviation after that.

See also

 Emblem of Sri Lanka, which also features the Dharmachakra
 Flag of Mongolia
 National Anthem of Mongolia
 Coat of arms of the Republic of Buryatia
 Coat of arms of Kalmykia
 Emblem of Tuva

References 

National symbols of Mongolia
Mongolia
Mongolia
Mongolia
Mongolia